Eva Díaz Pérez (born 1971) is a Spanish journalist and writer.

Biography
Eva Díaz Pérez has a licentiate in information sciences from the University of Seville. Her first job as a journalist was at the now-defunct Diario 16. She worked at El Mundo for more than 20 years as an editor specializing in cultural issues. She has been a contributor to the newspapers ABC and El País and the magazines Mercurio and Andalucía en la Historia.

She began her literary career in 2001 with the publication of the satirical book El polvo del camino. El libro maldito del Rocío. In 2003 and 2004 she was a finalist for the National Journalism Award.

Also in 2005, she was a finalist for the Premio Nadal with her work El Club de la Memoria. In 2006, the Lara Foundation published her Hijos del Mediodía, which won RTVA's El Público Radio and Televisión Award for Andalusian Culture.

In 2011, Díaz published her fourth novel, El sonámbulo de Verdún, and in 2013, Adriático. The latter won the 7th , as well as the Andalusian Critics Award in May 2014. In 2013 she received a literary career award from the Seville Book Fair. Journalism awards she has won include the Francisco Valdés, Unicaja, University of Seville, City of Málaga, and City of Huelva.

In 2017 she published the novel El color de los ángeles about Baroque painter Bartolomé Esteban Murillo.

In non-fiction, Díaz is known for her essays La Andalucía del exilio (2008) and Travesías históricas: viajeros que contaron el mundo (2017), as well as the literary guide Sevilla, un retrato literario (2011). She is the co-author of the 2005 biography Salvador Távora. El sentimiento trágico de Andalucía.

She also teaches  classes at the EUSA University Center, attached to the University of Seville, where she has worked since 2013.

In 2018 she won the Andalusian Journalism Award for "Google time", a series of cultural articles published in the magazine Andalucía en la Historia. She was the curator of the Año Murillo, Seville's multidisciplinary event to commemorate the 400th anniversary of the painter's birth.

Works
 El polvo del camino. El libro maldito del Rocío (2001), Signatura Ediciones de Andalucía, 
 Memoria de cenizas (2005), Fundación José Manuel Lara, 
 Salvador Távora. El sentimiento trágico de Andalucía (2005), Fundación José Manuel Lara, 
 Hijos del Mediodía (2006), Fundación José Manuel Lara, 
 La Andalucía del exilio (2008), Fundación José Manuel Lara, 
 El Club de la Memoria (2008), Ediciones Destino, 
 Sevilla, un retrato literario (2011), Editorial Paréntesis, 
 El sonámbulo de Verdún (2011), Ediciones Destino, 
 Adriático (2013), Fundación José Manuel Lara, 
 El color de los ángeles (2017), Planeta, 
 Travesías históricas: viajeros andaluces que contaron el mundo. (2017), Fundación José Manuel Lara,

Awards and recognitions

Journalism
 2003 and 2004 finalist for the National Journalism Award
 1997 City of Huelva Award
 2008 City of Málaga Award
 2008 University of Seville Journalism Award
 2012 Unicaja Award for Journalistic Articles
 2015 Francisco Valdés Journalism Award
 2018 Andalusian Journalism Award

Literature
 2005 Unamuno Award
 2006 RTVA El Público Award
 2008 finalist for the Premio Nadal
 2013 Andalusian Critics Award
 2013 
 2013 Seville Book Fair Career Award

References

External links
 

1971 births
21st-century Spanish educators
21st-century Spanish novelists
21st-century Spanish women writers
Living people
Writers from Seville
Spanish journalists
Spanish women academics
Spanish women essayists
Spanish women journalists
Spanish women novelists
University of Seville alumni
21st-century women educators